The Chariot mansion is one of the Twenty-Eight Mansions of the Chinese constellations. It is one of the southern mansions of the Vermilion Bird.

Asterisms

References 

Chinese constellations